Hanna Hertelendy (born Ilona Zimka; October 5, 1919 – May 15, 2008), also known as Hanna Landy, was a Hungarian-American film and television actress.

Early years
She was born as Ilona Zimka near Budapest. She married István Hertelendy in 1940. She became a successful stage actress with the Hungarian Repertory Theatre Vígszínház in Budapest, playing such roles as Ophelia (Hamlet), Irina  (Chekhov's Three Sisters), in Molnár's Liliom and in J.B. Priestley's An Inspector Calls.

She came to New York City and, in 1947, became a lifelong member of the Actors Studio.

Career
She continued to act on television in such series as Peter Gunn, Perry Mason, Barnaby Jones, Ironside, Marcus Welby, M.D., The Fugitive, Dr. Kildare, Columbo and Wonder Woman. Among her television roles was as murderer Helga Dolwig in the 1965 Perry Mason episode, "The Case of the Impetuous Imp," as well as Nazi villainess Lena Greenberg on Magnum, P.I.. Notable films in which she appeared include Five Minutes to Live (1961), Harlow (1965), Convict Stage (1965), In Like Flint (1967), Rosemary's Baby (1968), The Girl from Petrovka (1974), Two-Minute Warning (1976), Raid on Entebbe (1977), Being There (1979), Christmas Lilies of the Field (1979) and Circle of Power (1981). Others included independent films such as Return (1985).

Affiliations
She was active for more than 40 years with the Academy of Motion Picture Arts and Sciences and the North Hollywood-based Theater West.

Family
Hertelendy was the third and last wife of film star Robert Walker, whom she married on July 27, 1949. Walker died at the age of 32 in 1951, reportedly due to an allergic reaction to a drug administered by his psychiatrist. Hertelendy was married four times; her last husband was Hungarian-American actor Stephen Bekassy. She had one child, from her marriage to William Kerwin, with whom she was married from 1953 until their 1958 divorce.

Death
She died in her West Hollywood, California home on May 15, 2008, aged 88.

Selected filmography

Idegen utakon (1944)
Ez történt Budapesten (1944) – Katinka
Vihar után (1945) – Piri
Hazugság nélkül (1946)
Mr. Walkie Talkie (1952) – Jane Winters 
The Leather Saint (1956) – Eva (uncredited)
Affair in Reno (1957) – Lizzie Kendall (uncredited)
Diamond Safari (1958) – Wanda
Legion of the Doomed (1958) – Woman on street 
The Decks Ran Red (1958) – Doris Belger
Ask Any Girl (1959) – Young Lady (uncredited)
Man on a String (1960) – Bess Harris
Operation Eichmann (1961) – Frau Tessa Hess
Breakfast at Tiffany's (1961) – Party Guest (uncredited)
Back Street (1961) – Nightclub Patron (uncredited)
The Explosive Generation (1961) – Mrs. Carlyle (uncredited)
Five Minutes to Live (1961) – Carol
The Interns (1962) – Mrs. Richter (uncredited)
Married Too Young (1962) – Mrs. Simmons (uncredited)
The New Interns (1964) – Admitting Clerk (uncredited)
Fort Courageous (1965) – The Mother
Harlow (1965) – Beatrice Landau
Git! (1965) – Mrs. Finney
Convict Stage (1965) – Mrs. Gregory
In Like Flint (1967) – Helena
Rosemary's Baby (1968) – Grace Cardiff
Adam at 6 A.M. (1970) – (uncredited)
The Jesus Trip (1971) – Sister Charlotte
Thirty Dangerous Seconds (1972)
I Love You... Good-bye (1974) – Emily Kimoto
The Girl from Petrovka (1974) – Judge
Murph the Surf (1975) – Arlene Dixon (uncredited)
Gus (1976) – Mama Petrovic
Two-Minute Warning (1976) – Couple at S.W.A.T. Call
Raid on Entebbe (1976) – Mrs. Gordon
Dark Echoes (1977) – Frau Ziemler
Being There (1979) – Natasha Skrapinov
Monster (1980) – Mrs. Byrd (uncredited)
Circle of Power (1981) – Sylvia Arnold
Micki & Maude (1984) – Admissions Clerk
Return (1985) – Elizabeth Holt (uncredited)
Hard Time Romance (1991)
Ring of Steel (1994) – Dorothy Bennett (uncredited)
Entourage (2000) – Mrs. Hyder (final film role)

References

External links
 Surname Hertelendy genealogy site
 Blogsite with info on Hanna Landy/Hertelendy
 

1919 births
2008 deaths
American film actresses
American television actresses
Hungarian film actresses
Hungarian stage actresses
Hungarian emigrants to the United States
Actresses from Budapest
Actresses from Los Angeles
20th-century American actresses
21st-century American women